Insect Observation Facility in Kiryū, Gunma, Japan is a learning facility for observing the ecology of insects. The building was designed by Tadao Ando, built by Takenaka Corporation with three other firms, and opened in 2005. The facility offers outdoor hands-on experience to allow visitors to observe and learn more about the world of insects.

External links
Gunma Insect World (official site) 
Gunma Insect World at Garden Vision 
Page about the building by Takenaka Corporation.

Tadao Ando buildings
Museums in Gunma Prefecture
Nature centers in Japan
Insectariums
Natural history museums in Japan
Museums established in 2005
2005 establishments in Japan
Kiryū, Gunma